Nilakka is a rather large lake in Northern Savonia, Finland. With the area of nearly 169 km2 it is the 25th largest lake in the country. It's a shallow lake, connected by canals to upper Lake Pielavesi and lower Iisvesi.

References

Kymi basin
Landforms of North Savo
Lakes of Keitele
Lakes of Tervo
Lakes of Pielavesi